= Yoshie Ueno (flautist) =

Japanese flautist

Ueno Yoshie (born Takamatsu, Kagawa Prefecture, Japan) is a female Japanese flautist. Ms. Yoshie is a multiple prize-winner who has performed in Japan before the emperor and empress, and also in the United States, Germany, France, Austria, Russia, Korea, China, and Taiwan. As of 2017 she was based in Paris, France.
